Karam Bal or Karambel, also rendered as Karim Bal, may refer to:
 Karam Bal-e Bakhshi
 Karam Bal-e Faqir
 Karam Bal-e Khodadad
 Karam Bal-e Ramazan